Ultraviolet is a solo studio album by American rapper Sadistik, released via Fake Four Inc. on July 1, 2014. It peaked at number 37 on the Billboard Heatseekers Albums chart.

Production
The late Eyedea is featured on "Chemical Burns". The album also features guest appearances from Nacho Picasso, Sticky Fingaz, and Tech N9ne. Production is handled by Sxmplelife, Eric G, Maulskull, and Kid Called Computer. The title of the album derives from a book about color spectrums.

Music videos were created for "Cult Leader", "1984", and "Orange".

Track listing

Charts

References

External links
 
 

2014 albums
Sadistik albums
Fake Four Inc. albums